Weinmannia is a genus of trees and shrubs in the family Cunoniaceae. It is the largest genus of the family with about 150 species. It is also the most widespread genus, occurring in Central and South America including the Caribbean, Madagascar and surrounding islands, Malesia and the islands of the South Pacific. It is absent from mainland Africa and Australia, but some fossils have been attributed to Weinmannia in Australia. Leaves are simple or pinnate, with a margin usually toothed, and interpetiolar stipules. Flowers are bisexual, white, arranged in racemes. The fruit is a capsule opening vertically from the top to the base. Seeds hairy without wings.

Taxonomy
The genus has been divided into five sections:
 Fasciculata (mostly Malesia, from Sumatra to Fiji)
 Inspersa (Madagascar)
 Leiospermum (mostly Pacific, from Bismarck archipelago to the Marquesas)
 Spicata (Madagascar and Comores)
 Weinmannia (Central and South America, Mascarenes)

A phylogenomic study by Pillon et al. (2021) concluded that Weinmannia was paraphyletic, and formed two distinct clades. The species belonging to the four Old World sections – Fasciculatae, Inspersae, Spicatae, and Leiospermum – formed a monophyletic group, which is sister to the Old World (mostly New Caledonian) genera Cunonia and Pancheria. Section Weinmannia, which includes species from the Americas and the Mascarene Islands, is sister to the Old World assemblage. They proposed placing the four Old World sections into the revived genus Pterophylla, with genus Weinmannia limited to the American and Mascarene species in section Weinmannia.

 The Plant List recognises 129 accepted species (including infraspecific names):

Fasciculata 

(mostly Malesia, from Sumatra to Fiji)
 Weinmannia aphanoneura  (Borneo & Sumatra)
 Weinmannia celebica  (Sulawesi)
 Weinmannia clemenisae  (Borneo)
 Weinmannia coodei  (Sulawesi)
 Weinmannia descombesiana  (Sulawesi)
 Weinmannia devogelii  (Sulawesi)
 Weinmannia exigua  (Fiji & Solomon Islands)
 Weinmannia eymaeana  (Sulawesi)
 Weinmannia furfuracea  (Sulawesi & Seram)
 Weinmannia fraxinea  (Malesia & Solomon Islands)
 Weinmannia hooglandii  (Peninsular Malaysia)
 Weinmannia hutchinsonii  (Philippines)
 Weinmannia lucida  (Philippines)
 Weinmannia luzoniensis  (Philippines)
 Weinmannia macgillivrayi  (Vanuatu)
 Weinmannia negrosensis  (Sulawesi & Philippines)
 Weinmannia pullei  (New Guinea)
 Weinmannia richii  (Fiji)
 Weinmannia spiraeoides  (Fiji)
 Weinmannia urdanetensis  (Philippines& New Guinea)
 Weinmannia ysabelensis  (Solomon Islands)

Inspersa
 
(Madagascar)

 Weinmannia commersonii  
 Weinmannia henricorum  
 Weinmannia hepaticarum 
 Weinmannia louveliana  
 Weinmannia lowryana  
 Weinmannia madagascariensis  
 Weinmannia rutenbergii  (Madagascar)
 Weinmannia venusta

Leiospermum 

(mostly Pacific, from Bismarck archipelago to the Marquesas)

 Weinmannia affinis  (Fiji, ?Samoa)
 Weinmannia croftii  (Bismarck archipelago)
 Weinmannia denhamii  (Vanuatu)
 Weinmannia dichotoma  (New Caledonia)
 Weinmannia marquesana  (Marquesas)
 Weinmannia ouaiemensis  (New Caledonia)
 Weinmannia paitensis  (New Caledonia)
 Weinmannia parviflora  (Society Islands)
 Weinmannia purpurea  (Bougainville & Solomon Islands)
 Weinmannia racemosa  (New Zealand)
 Weinmannia raiateensis  (Society Islands)
 Weinmannia rapensis  (Austral Islands)
 Weinmannia serrata  (New Caledonia)
 Weinmannia sylvicola  (New Zealand)
 Weinmannia tremuloides  (Marquesas)
 Weinmannia vescoi  (Society Islands)
 Weinmannia vitiensis  (Fiji)

Spicata 

(Madagascar and Comores)

 Weinmannia arguta  
 Weinmannia baehniana  
 Weinmannia bojeriana  
 Weinmannia comorensis 
 Weinmannia decora  
 Weinmannia eriocarpa  
 Weinmannia hildebrandtii 
 Weinmannia humbertiana  
 Weinmannia humblotii  
 Weinmannia icacifolia  
 Weinmannia integrifolia  
 Weinmannia lucens  
 Weinmannia mammea  
 Weinmannia marojejyensis  
 Weinmannia minutiflora  
 Weinmannia pauciflora  
 Weinmannia rakotomalazana  
 Weinmannia sanguisugarum  
 Weinmannia stenostachya  
 Weinmannia venosa

Weinmannia 

(Central and South America, Mascarenes)

 Weinmannia abstrusa  (Honduras)
 Weinmannia anisophylla  (Colombia, Costa Rica, Guatemala, Honduras)
 Weinmannia apurimacensis  (Southeastern Peru)
 Weinmannia auriculata  (Colombia, Ecuador, Peru, northwestern Venezuela)
 var. bogotensis  
 var. dryadifolia  
 Weinmannia auriculifera  
 Weinmannia baccariniana  (Venezuela and Peru)
 Weinmannia balbisiana  (Southeastern Mexico to Bolivia)
 var. calothyrsa  
 Weinmannia bangii  (Peru and Bolivia)
 Weinmannia biviniana  (Mauritius)
 Weinmannia boliviensis  (Bolivia)
 Weinmannia brachystachya  (Peru and southern Venezuela)
 Weinmannia burserifolia  (Nicaragua, Costa Rica, Panama)
 Weinmannia chryseis  (Colombia and Peru)
 Weinmannia cinerea  (Peru)
 Weinmannia cochensis  (Colombia and Ecuador)
 Weinmannia cogolloi  (Colombia)
 Weinmannia corocoroensis  (Venezuela)
 Weinmannia costulata  (Southern Ecuador)
 Weinmannia crassifolia  (Peru and Bolivia)
 Weinmannia cundinamarcensis  (Colombia, Peru, and western Bolivia)
 Weinmannia cutervensis  
 Weinmannia cymbifolia  (Peru)
 Weinmannia davidsonii  (Bolivia)
 Weinmannia descendens  (Northern Peru)
 Weinmannia discolor  (southeastern and southern Brazil)
 Weinmannia dryadifolia  
 Weinmannia dzieduszyckii  (Peru)
 Weinmannia elliptica  (Peru, Ecuador, Colombia, and Venezuela)
 var. trichocarpa  
 Weinmannia fagaroides  (Costa Rica to Bolivia) 
 var. trollii  
 Weinmannia geometrica  (Bolivia)
 Weinmannia glomerata  (Peru)
 Weinmannia guyanensis  (Guyana and southeastern Venezuela)
 Weinmannia haenkeana  (Ecuador, Peru, and Bolivia)
 Weinmannia heterophylla  (Venezuela, Colombia, Ecuador, Peru, and Bolivia)
 Weinmannia horrida  (Costa Rica and Panama)
 Weinmannia humilis  (southeastern and southern Brazil)
 Weinmannia ibaguensis  (Colombia)
 Weinmannia ilutepuiensis  (Venezuela)
 Weinmannia intermedia  (southern Mexico and Honduras)
 Weinmannia jahnii  (northwestern Venezuela)
 Weinmannia jelskii  (Ecuador, Peru)
 Weinmannia karsteniana  (Costa Rica, Panama, Colombia, and northwestern Venezuela)
 Weinmannia kunthiana  (Peru, Ecuador, Colombia, and northwestern Venezuela)
 Weinmannia lansbergiana  (Peru, northeastern Colombia, and Venezuela)
 Weinmannia latifolia  (Colombia, Ecuador, and Peru)
 Weinmannia laurina  (Venezuela, Colombia, Panama, and Peru)
 Weinmannia laxiramea  (Guyana and southeastern Venezuela)
 Weinmannia lechleriana  (Bolivia, Peru, Colombia, and Venezuela)
 Weinmannia lentiscifolia  (Bolivia, Peru, Ecuador, Colombia, and Venezuela)
 Weinmannia lopezana  (Colombia)
 Weinmannia loxensis  (Ecuador)
 Weinmannia lyrata  (Bolivia)
 Weinmannia machupicchuensis  (Peru)
 Weinmannia macrophylla  (central Colombia and Ecuador)
 Weinmannia macrostachya  
 Weinmannia magnifolia  (Colombia and Ecuador)
 Weinmannia mariquitae  (Colombia and Ecuador)
 Weinmannia microphylla  (Venezuela, Peru, and Colombia)
 var. tenuior  
 Weinmannia multijuga  (Bolivia, Peru, Ecuador, Colombia, and Venezuela)
 Weinmannia organensis  (Peru and southeastern and southern Brazil)
 Weinmannia ovata  (Bolivia, Peru, Ecuador, Colombia, and Venezuela)
 Weinmannia parvifoliolata  (Colombia)
 Weinmannia paulliniifolia  (southeastern and southern Brazil)
 Weinmannia pentaphylla  (Peru)
 Weinmannia pinnata   (Caribbean, Central America, Andes, and Brazil)
 Weinmannia piurensis  (Peru)
 Weinmannia polyphylla  (Costa Rica, Colombia, Ecuador, Peru, and Bolivia)
 Weinmannia portlandiana  (Jamaica)
 Weinmannia pubescens  (Peru, Ecuador, Colombia, and Venezuela)
 var. arcabucoana  
 var. popayanensis  
 Weinmannia reticulata  (Bolivia, Peru, Ecuador, and Colombia)
 Weinmannia rhoifolia  (Bolivia)
 Weinmannia rollottii  (Andes of Colombia and Ecuador)
 var. subvelutina  
 Weinmannia silvatica  
 Weinmannia sorbifolia  (Peru, Ecuador, Colombia, and Venezuela)
 var. caliana  
 var. sclerophylla  
 Weinmannia spruceana  (Bolivia, Peru, Ecuador, Colombia, and Venezuela)
 Weinmannia stenocarpa  (Ecuador)
 Weinmannia subsessiliflora  (Colombia, Peru, and west-central Brazil)
 var. caquetana  
 Weinmannia ternata  (Peru)
 Weinmannia testudineata  (northeastern Colombia and northwestern Venezuela)
 Weinmannia tinctoria  (Mascarene Islands) 
 Weinmannia tolimensis  (Colombia)
 Weinmannia tomentosa  (Colombia and northwestern Venezuela)
 Weinmannia trianae  (Costa Rica, Colombia, Ecuador, Peru, and Bolivia)
 Weinmannia trichosperma  (Argentina and Chile)
 Weinmannia ulei  (Northern Peru)
 Weinmannia vegasana  (Colombia)
 Weinmannia velutina  (Peru, Venezuela, Guyana, and northern Brazil)
 Weinmannia vulcanicola  (Costa Rica)
 Weinmannia wercklei  (Costa Rica and Panama)
 Weinmannia yungasensis  (Bolivia)

References

External links 

 
Oxalidales genera
Flora of New Caledonia